Pierpaolo Ferrazzi (born 23 July 1965 in Bassano del Grappa) is an Italian slalom canoeist who competed from the late 1980s to the mid-2000s (decade). Competing in four Summer Olympics, he won two medals in the K1 event with a gold in 1992 and a bronze in 2000.

Ferrazzi also won three silver medals in the K1 team event at the ICF Canoe Slalom World Championships, earning them in 1989, 2002 and 2005.

He won the overall World Cup title in K1 twice (1990 and 1992). At the European Championships he has won a total of three medals (2 golds and 1 bronze).

World Cup individual podiums

References
DatabaseOlympics.com profile

Sports-reference.com profile

1965 births
Canoeists at the 1992 Summer Olympics
Canoeists at the 1996 Summer Olympics
Canoeists at the 2000 Summer Olympics
Canoeists at the 2004 Summer Olympics
Italian male canoeists
Living people
Olympic canoeists of Italy
Olympic gold medalists for Italy
Olympic bronze medalists for Italy
Olympic medalists in canoeing
Medalists at the 2000 Summer Olympics
Medalists at the 1992 Summer Olympics
Medalists at the ICF Canoe Slalom World Championships